The D Generations Cup was the first professional wrestling round-robin tournament held by DDT Pro-Wrestling under the "D Generations" branch, between January 29 and February 26, 2023. The tournament featured eight young talents from the company, in a similar fashion to the Young Drama Cup, last held in 2011.

Contestants are divided in two blocks of four ("A" and "B"). Each participant faces all three other wrestlers within the same block in singles matches. The winner of each block is determined via a point system, with two points for a win, one point for a draw, and no points for a loss. On the final day of the event, the winners of each block will face each other to determine the winner of the tournament, who will also earn a spot on the DDT shows in Hollywood on March 30 and 31.

Background
DDT Pro-Wrestling announced the participants of the D Generations Cup on January 2, 2023. The schedule was announced on January 10.

Tournament

See also
Young Drama Cup
DDT Pro-Wrestling
Professional wrestling in Japan

References

External links

Wrestle Universe

DDT Pro-Wrestling
Professional wrestling tournaments